The St. Louis Cardinals are a Major League Baseball team based in St. Louis, Missouri. They are a member of the Central Division of Major League Baseball's National League. The team has played under three names since beginning play in 1882: the current moniker, the Perfectos, as well as the Browns. Since the franchise's inception,  players have made an appearance in a competitive game for the team, whether as an offensive player (batting and baserunning) or a defensive player (fielding, pitching, or both).

Footnotes
 Key
  The National Baseball Hall of Fame and Museum determines which cap a player wears on their plaque, signifying "the team with which he made his most indelible mark". The Hall of Fame considers the player's wishes in making their decision, but the Hall makes the final decision as "it is important that the logo be emblematic of the historical accomplishments of that player's career".
  Players are listed at a position if they appeared in 30% of their games or more during their Cardinals career, as defined by Baseball-Reference.com. Additional positions may be shown on the Baseball-Reference website by following each player's citation.
  Franchise batting and pitching leaders are drawn from Baseball-Reference.com. A total of 1,500 plate appearances are needed to qualify for batting records, and 500 innings pitched or 50 decisions are required to qualify for pitching records.
  Statistics are correct as of the end of the 2011 Major League Baseball season.

References 

 General
 
 

 Specific

St. Louis Cardinals all-time roster